"Early in the Morning" is a song originally performed by The Gap Band, and written by member Charlie Wilson and producers Lonnie Simmons and Rudy Taylor.

Chart performance 
It was released as a single in 1982 and went on to become their biggest hit on the US Billboard Hot 100, peaking at number 24, and also topped Billboard's R&B chart for three weeks. The single also peaked at number 13 on the dance charts.

Chart positions

Cover versions
The song was a hit again when Robert Palmer covered it in 1988. This version peaked at number 19 on the Billboard Hot 100 and is to date the highest charting version of the song on that chart.  Cash Box said that Palmer "creates a Volga River Boatman-like chorus that clearly illustrates his image of early morning loneliness."

Popular culture
The song was used as the music for a film-making montage in Michel Gondry's 2008 film, Be Kind Rewind.
Nirvana drummer Dave Grohl credits the song "Early in the Morning" for inspiring the drum intro on their hit "Smells Like Teen Spirit."

References

1982 singles
1988 singles
The Gap Band songs
Robert Palmer (singer) songs
Songs written by Charlie Wilson (singer)
Songs written by Lonnie Simmons
Songs written by Rudy Taylor
1982 songs